Yanko Shire was a local government area in the Riverina region of New South Wales, Australia.

Yanko Shire was proclaimed on 7 March 1906. On 6 January 1928, Willimbong Shire (later renamed Leeton Shire) was excised from its territory as per the provisions of the Irrigation Act 1912.

Yanko Shire shared an administration office with the Municipality of Narrandera.

The shire was amalgamated with the Municipality of Narrandera on 1 January 1960 to form Narrandera Shire.

References

Former local government areas of New South Wales
1906 establishments in Australia
1960 disestablishments in Australia
Local government areas of the Riverina